Mytopia was an online games provider mostly popular on Facebook and on mobile devices. The studio operates several games, largest to date is Bingo Island 2.

Mytopia started as a division of Real Dice, Inc, developing a cross-platforms cross-social-networks game world first launched at TechCrunch50 2008 event. It later became focused on Facebook as its main platform and released games tailored for that platform, while still operating several multiplayer mobile games.

On 14 June 2010 Mytopia was acquired by 888 Holdings and became a part of a subsidiary of 888 Holdings, based in the UK.

References

External links 
 

Video game companies established in 2006
Defunct video game companies of the United Kingdom
Video game development companies
Virtual economies
British companies established in 2006